Iss Pyaar Ko Kya Naam Doon? ( What Should We Name This Love?) is an Indian Hindi-language romantic drama television series that aired on Star Plus from 6 June 2011 to 30 November 2012. Produced by Gul Khan under 4 Lions Films, it starred Barun Sobti and Sanaya Irani. It is the first installment of the Iss Pyaar Ko Kya Naam Doon? series.

On 24 November 2015, Hotstar launched an eight episode web series, Iss Pyaar Ko Kya Naam Doon? – Ek Jashan, to extend the Iss Pyaar Ko Kya Naam Doon? storyline. Barun Sobti and Sanaya Irani reprised their respective roles as Arnav and Khushi.

Plot

The story revolves around a Delhi-based business tycoon, Arnav Singh Raizada (ASR), and a middle-class girl from Lucknow, Khushi Kumari Gupta.

Khushi stumbles into Arnav in Lucknow after mistakenly crashing one of his promotional fashion events. Arnav accuses Khushi of deliberately disrupting the show. Khushi pleads innocence. This delays her duties towards her sister Payal's wedding, which is canceled. Meanwhile, Khushi gets harassed by eve-teasers and is saved by Shyam Manohar Jha, a married man, who instantly gets attracted to her beauty and begins to pursue Khushi romantically. Rebuked by society, Khushi's adoptive parents decide to send Payal and Khushi to live with their paternal aunt in Delhi. Khushi is adopted as her parents had died in a car crash when she was young. Her maternal aunt and uncle had decided to take them in.

The two sisters arrive in Delhi to live with their aunt. Upon traveling on a scooter, she bumps into Arnav’s car. He challenges her to pay for the damage, and Khushi accepts. She goes on to sell Lucknow's indigenous Chikankaari sarees to pay for Arnav's broken car, and she ends up at his house, Shantivan, by mistake. She meets Arnav's sister, Anjali, and their maternal grandmother, Devyani Devi, fondly called Naani. Both of them take an instant liking to the lively and cheerful Khushi as she reminds them of their hometown Lucknow. She successfully sells her sarees and gets an even bigger order from them, only to be falsely framed by Arnav's aunt, Manorama, to have sold torn sarees. Thus, she loses the order and finds herself unable to gather the money to pay Arnav for the car damages.

Back at her aunt's, Shyam, who is Anjali's husband, reaches Khushi's place as a bachelor wanting to get engaged to Khushi. Khushi asks Shyam to help her get a job, and thus she reaches ASR's office. Khushi's clumsiness irritates Arnav, so he does not want her in his office. Khushi, not wanting to give up, taunts Arnav, and eventually, they sign a 15-day contract, which says if she quits before the end of the contract period, Khushi would have to pay ASR one lakh rupees. Khushi takes up the challenge only to find ASR going out of his way to make her quit the job somehow. He makes her miserable by assigning her humanely impossible tasks, but Khushi does them all in stride. In a particularly life-threatening situation, Arnav rescues Khushi and briefly regrets putting her in that predicament. Tired of these antics, Payal convinces Khushi to quit the job, and the two sisters decide to go back to Lucknow. However, inspiration hits Khushi, who believes that it is a sign from the goddess she has strong faith in (Devi Maiyya). They decide to stay and open a sweet shop and as luck would have it, they end up at the Raizada house to fulfill an order of sweets for Anjali's wedding anniversary celebrations.

At Shantivan, one thing leads to another, and Anjali hires Khushi to groom Arnav's girlfriend, Lavanya, to make her the perfect daughter-in-law of the Raizadas. Khushi's constant presence at his house initially irritates Arnav, but her funny antics and lively nature wins him over slowly. He refuses to admit this and frequently taunts Khushi about her social status, in an attempt to satisfy his own ego. 
During Diwali celebrations, Arnav and Khushi share an intimate moment that Arnav is in denial about. He then says he is willing to marry Lavanya, much to his own displeasure, and because he is not willing to come to terms that he is in fact in love with Khushi. Khushi is devastated when she hears this. On the other hand, Shyam is successful in getting engaged to Khushi. Arnav is terribly disappointed when he learns that Khushi is engaged to be married to another man and once again resorts to his old ways of making her miserable.

On a parallel, Arnav's cousin Akash falls in love with Payal and proposes marriage. As the wedding preparations begin, Khushi's adoptive father, Shashi, discovers Shyam's secret - that he is married to Anjali. When he tries to reveal this to the rest of the family, Shyam tortures him into partial paralysis, rendering him unable to speak. Shyam then cleverly manipulates Buaji under the pretext of taking up family responsibilities instead.

With the wedding rituals beginning in Raizada and Gupta household, it becomes increasingly difficult for Shyam to hide his secret, and eventually, Khushi finds out the truth and breaks the engagement, enraging Shyam. Shyam then threatens to ruin Akash and Payal’s relationship. Khushi doesn't want to break Payal's wedding and she thinks that Anjali would be heartbroken so she doesn't reveal the truth to the Raizadas. Arnav realizes that he is in love with Khushi and breaks off his engagement with Lavanya. He plans on professing his love to Khushi on Payal and Akash's wedding day, when he overhears Shyam professing his love to Khushi and pleading for her to marry him, and mistakes Khushi to be instigating Shyam to break off his marriage with Anjali. To save his now pregnant sister's marital life, Arnav blackmails Khushi into marrying him for six months, by keeping Payal's wedding at stake. A heartbroken and confused Khushi reluctantly agrees to this just so she can save Payal's wedding.

Khushi and Arnav begin a pretend marriage filled with love and hate. They constantly bicker and prank one another while also deeply caring for each other. Khushi brings Arnav to her aunt's house to irk him more but they bond in the time they spend together. She starts to wonder why Arnav married her. She suspects that Arnav is trying to kill her in order to marry Lavanya and decides to commit suicide instead. Arnav saves her and tells her that he knows the truth about her and Shyam. Enraged by this, Khushi explains the story in its entirety but Arnav refuses to believe her. On the other hand, Shyam, greedy for the Raizada estate and industries, plans to murder Arnav and arranges his abduction. Khushi manages to rescue him with the help of his NRI cousin - Nandkishore (NK) and Manorama. Arnav comes home, exposes Shyam, and throws him out, causing Anjali to fall into depression. Over the next few days, Anjali begins meeting Shyam secretly, who continues to deceive her with his manipulative ways. Meanwhile, Anjali and Arnav's paternal grandmother, Subhadra Devi (Dadi), arrives at Shantivan and takes an instant disliking towards Khushi, but Khushi receives support from Arnav and other family members. Subhadra Devi is also displeased to learn about Shyam and Anjali's separation and tries her best to bring Shyam back to Shantivan. During the Janamashtmi celebrations, Khushi realizes that her wedding ceremony lacked the rituals to bind her and Arnav in holy matrimony and thus insists that Arnav fulfill them. Subhadra Devi overhears this and insults Khushi for living with Arnav without being properly married. Arnav finally agrees to marry Khushi in an elaborate ceremony so as to make their relationship official. Subhadra Devi, however, is still displeased and tries to call off the wedding, suspecting a connection between Khushi's mother and Arnav's parents' death. Shyam gets a hint of this and plots to use it to his advantage in stopping Arnav and Khushi's wedding. It is revealed that Khushi's adoptive mother Garima had an extra-marital affair with Arnav's father, unaware of the fact that he was a married man. When Arnav's mother learns of this, she kills herself. This leads to Arnav's father taking his life, too, out of guilt. Subhadra Devi holds Garima responsible for the deaths of her son and daughter-in-law.

As the wedding preparations begin, unaware of Shyam's duplicity, Subhadra Devi encourages Anjali to meet and repair her relationship with him. Shyam, on the other hand, hatches a plan for Anjali's miscarriage, which he brings to fruition on her baby shower day. Anjali falls deeper into depression and adamantly asks Shyam to be allowed back in the house. Khushi notices that Anjali feels better in Shyam's presence and for the sake of Anjali's well-being decides to bring Shyam back to Shantivan, much to Arnav's displeasure. However, they sort out their differences, reassure each other of their love and trust, and consummate their relationship.

On the wedding day, Subhadra Devi reveals the truth to Arnav about his parents' suicide. Initially shattered, he realizes that Garima was unaware of his father's marriage, and punishing Khushi for something that she did not do would be unfair. Arnav marries her despite Subhadra Devi's opposition and makes it clear to her that his father was to be equally blamed for their family's sufferings and that holding Garima alone responsible would be wrong.

On their wedding night, Arnav and Khushi discover several cameras hidden in their room and all over the Raizada house and realize that they could be placed by Shyam. With some investigative work, they further discover that Shyam was responsible for Anjali's miscarriage. Arnav, Khushi, and NK together expose Shyam, who confesses to his misdeeds. Anjali finally sees him for who he truly is and throws him out of the house.

As Khushi and Arnav's relationship gets better, Arnav's college friend Sheetal drops in with Aarav, an orphan, disguising him as Arnav's "son" to inherit Arnav's property. Arnav exposes Sheetal’s plan to extort money from him, and later Arnav & Khushi adopt Aarav. Khushi later runs for a beauty pageant due to wanting to establish her own identity. With Arnav and his family’s motivation, she goes on to win it and they live happily ever after.

Cast

Main
Barun Sobti as Arnav  Singh Raizada – Ratna and Arvind's son, Anjali's younger brother, Akash and Nandkishore's cousin brother, Khushi's husband. Aarav's father.(2011–2012)
Sanaya Irani as Khushi Kumari Gupta Singh Raizada (née Kumari Gupta) – Garima and Shashi's adopted daughter, Payal's younger sister.Arnav's wife.Aarav's mother.(2011-2012).

Recurring
Dalljiet Kaur as Anjali Singh Raizada – Ratna and Arvind's daughter-eldest sister of Arnav,Akash,and Nandkishore.  
Abhaas Mehta as Shyam Manohar Jha – Anjali's ex-husband; Khushi's former fiancé (2011–2012)
Deepali Pansare as Payal Singh Raizada – Shashi's and Garima's daughter-eldest sister of Khushi.Akash's wife (2011–2012)
Akshay Dogra as Akash Singh Raizada – Manorama and Mahendra's son-younger brother of Anjali,and Arnavelder brother of Nandkishore. Payal's husband (2011–2012)
Sanjay Batra as Shashi Gupta – Madhumati's brother; Garima and Sandhya's husband; Payal's father and Khushi's foster father (2011–2012)
Tuhinaa Vohra/Pyumori Mehta Ghosh as Garima Gupta – Gauri's sister; Shashi's second wife; Payal's step-mother; Khushi's aunt and adoptive mother (2011–2012)
Abha Parmar as Madhumati Gupta – Shashi's sister; Payal and Khushi's aunt (2011–2012)
Jayshree T. as Devyani Raizada – Ratna and Mahendra's mother; Subhadra's childhood friend; Anjali, Arnav and Akash's grandmother (2011–2012)
Utkarsha Naik as Manorama Raizada – Manohar's wife; Akash's mother; Anjali, Arnav and NK's aunt (2011–2012)
Rajesh Jais as Mahendra Singh Raizada – Devyani's son; Ratna's brother; Manorama's husband; Akash's father, Anjali, Arnav and NK's uncle (2011–2012)
Karan Godhwani as Nandkishore "NK" Mittal– Manorama's nephew; Arnav's cousin (2011–2012)
Vishesh Bansal as Aarav Singh Raizada – Arnav & Khushi’s adoptive son (2012)
Swati Chitnis as Subhadra Malik: Devyani's childhood friend; Anjali and Arnav's grandmother (2012)
Dinesh Nag as Hari Prakash "HP" Yadav (2011)
Sana Makbul as Lavanya Kashyap: Arnav's former girlfriend (2011)
Roshni Rastogi as Preetika aka Preeto (2011)
Zuber K. Khan as Rahim Mirza (2011)
Amit Dua as Vikrant Goel: Co-organizer of the Ms. India Contest (2012)
 Ahmad Harhash as Ahill Raza Ibrahim (2011-2012)
Gaurav Muskesh as reporter
Yogesh Tripathi as Kamlesh Khabari (2011)
Dhriti Bhatia as Bubbly (2012)
Madhura Naik as Sheetal Kapoor (2012)

Guest appearances
Hanif Hilal as Guest (Dance performance to Character Dheela for Anjali-Shyam's anniversary) (2011)
Nicole Alvares as Guest (Dance performance to Character Dheela for Anjali-Shyam's anniversary) (2011)

Production

Casting
The show was produced and directed by Gul Khan under the banner of 4 Lions Films. Barun Sobti was cast as Arnav Singh Raizada after the original choice, Karan Singh Grover, opted out of the role to focus on his film career and Sanaya Irani replaced Shraddha Arya who had originally been cast as the female lead. Dalljiet Kaur, Deepali Pansare & Akshay Dogra were finalized to play supporting roles to the main leads. Other supporting cast include Jayshree T., Tuhina Vohra, Abha Parmar, Utkarsha Naik, Sanjay Batra and many other actors. Abhaas Mehta and Sana Makbul entered the show as antagonists of the show. Sana later quit the show in December 2011.

Cancellation
When Barun Sobti announced his break from the show due to health problems, fans of the series requested the production team to shut down the show on a happy note rather than any replacement.

Reception
In week 15 to 21 of 2011, it entered top ten Hindi GEC list garnering 2.6 TVR occupying ninth position.

Awards and nominations

Spinoff 
In 2015, Hotstar launched a finite web series of eight episodes titled Iss Pyaar Ko Kya Naam Doon? - Ek Jashn with the original cast and the characters. The story revolves around Arnav and Khushi's married life after three years.

Adaptations

References

External links
Iss Pyaar Ko Kya Naam Doon? Streaming on Hotstar

Indian drama television series
StarPlus original programming
2011 Indian television series debuts
2012 Indian television series endings
Television shows set in Delhi
Hindi-language Disney+ Hotstar original programming
2015 web series debuts
2015 web series endings
Television series by 4 Lions Films
Hindi-language television shows
Indian romance television series